Beck House may refer to:
(sorted by state, then city/town)

William King Beck House, Camden, Alabama, listed on the National Register of Historic Places (NRHP) in Wilcox County
Smith-Beck House, Benson, Arizona, listed on the NRHP in Cochise County
Albert Beck House, Boise, Idaho, listed on the NRHP in Ada County
Waldron-Beck House and Carriage House, Lafayette, Indiana, listed on the NRHP in Tippecanoe County
James A. Beck House, Fairfield, Iowa, listed on the NRHP in Jefferson County
Chief Justice Joseph M. Beck House, Fort Madison, Iowa, listed on the NRHP in Lee County
James Burnie Beck House, Lexington, Kentucky, listed on the NRHP in Fayette County
Klir Beck House, Mt. Vernon, Maine, listed on the NRHP in Kennebec County
Beck-Warren House, Cambridge, Massachusetts, listed on the NRHP in Middlesex County
Beck House (Vicksburg, Mississippi), listed on the NRHP in Warren County
Alice Beck Cabin, Lake McDonald, Montana, listed on the NRHP in Flathead County
Samuel Beck House, Portsmouth, New Hampshire, listed on the NRHP in Rockingham County
Beck House (Sunbury, Pennsylvania), listed on the NRHP in Northumberland County
Frederick Beck Farm, San Angelo, Texas, listed on the NRHP in Tom Green County
Reid Beck House, Draper, Utah, listed on the NRHP in Salt Lake County
Michael and Margaritha Beck Farmstead, Jefferson, Wisconsin, listed on the NRHP in Jefferson County